Karam Dana (كرم دعنا) is a Palestinian American academic. He is the Alyson McGregor Distinguished Professor of Excellence and Transformative Research at the University of Washington Bothell, which is the first named-professorship to ever be established at the institution. He is Associate Professor of Middle Eastern and Islamic Studies, and the founding director of the American Muslim Research Institute (AMRI).

Biography
He was born and raised in al-Khalil/Hebron (الخليل), West Bank, Palestine. He migrated to the US in the late 1990s. He studied at Seattle Central Community College before transferring to the University of Washington. He holds a Bachelor of Arts degree with a double major in Economics and Political Science. He received a Master of Arts in International Studies from the Jackson School of International Studies. After receiving his PhD from the University of Washington in 2009, he completed a one-year post-doctoral fellowship at the Center for Middle Eastern Studies at Harvard University. He worked as a Research Fellow at the Belfer Center for Science and International Affairs at Harvard Kennedy School of Government. He previously taught at Harvard University and Tufts University before joining the University of Washington faculty. Karam Dana has received the University of Washington's Distinguished Teaching Award for 2018.

Scholarship 
Dana is one of the earliest scholars of Islam and Muslims in the US, and served as the co-PI of the Muslim American Public Opinion Survey (MAPOS), which was one of the earliest national surveys of American Muslims. He also studies the question of Palestine, the impact of Israeli occupation on Palestinian society, and Palestinian transnationalism. He has published widely on American Muslim political behavior, identity politics, and on the question of Palestine. He has lectured widely, and made media appearances, locally, nationally, and around the world.

References

Palestinian American
University of Washington faculty
University of Washington alumni
Year of birth missing (living people)
Living people